Maipo is a stratovolcano in the Andes, lying on the border between Argentina and Chile. It has a symmetrical, conical volcanic shape, and is among the southernmost 5,000 metre peaks in the Andes.

Maipo is located within the Diamante caldera, a feature measuring 15 km by 20 km that is about half a million years old. It rises about 1,900 m (6,230 ft) above the floor of the caldera. Immediately to the east of the peak, on the eastern side of the caldera floor, is Laguna del Diamante, a lake that formed when lava flows blocked drainage channels from the caldera in 1826. The Diamante Caldera erupted  of tephra, 450 ka.

The region's climate is transitional between the drier Mediterranean climate of the peaks to the north and the cold, moist climate of Chilean Patagonia. Hence, while less glaciated than Patagonia, it has more permanent snow on the wet, Chilean side than peaks of similar elevation to the north.

See also
 List of volcanoes in Chile
 List of volcanoes in Argentina

References

Notes

Sources
 Volcan Maipo or Maipú (span.) 
 

Mountains of Mendoza Province
Volcanoes of Mendoza Province
Mountains of Santiago Metropolitan Region
Volcanoes of Santiago Metropolitan Region
Stratovolcanoes of Chile
Subduction volcanoes
Active volcanoes
VEI-7 volcanoes
Stratovolcanoes of Argentina
Argentina–Chile border
International mountains of South America
Five-thousanders of the Andes
Principal Cordillera
Holocene stratovolcanoes